Tommaso Sala (born 6 September 1995) is an Italian World Cup alpine ski racer, and specializes in the technical events, with a focus on slalom.

World Cup results

Season standings

Top ten results

 0 podiums – 5 top tens (5 SL)

World Championship results

Olympic results

European Cup results
Wins

National titles
Italian Alpine Ski Championships
Slalom: 2017

References

External links
 
 

1995 births
Living people
Italian male alpine skiers
Alpine skiers of Fiamme Oro
Sportspeople from Milan
Alpine skiers at the 2022 Winter Olympics
Olympic alpine skiers of Italy